The 2021 Patriot League women's soccer tournament was the postseason women's soccer tournament for the Patriot League held from October 31 through November 7, 2021. The tournament was held at campus sites, with the higher seeded team hosting. The six-team single-elimination tournament consisted of three rounds based on seeding from regular season conference play. The defending champions were the Navy Midshipmen, however they were unable to defend their crown, after losing to Bucknell in the Semifinals.  Bucknell went on to win the tournament, defeating Boston University, who were the #1 seed, 1–0 in the final. The conference championship was the fifth for the Bucknell women's soccer program, three of which have come under head coach Kelly Cook.  As tournament champions, Bucknell earned the Patriot League's automatic berth into the 2021 NCAA Division I Women's Soccer Tournament.

Seeding 
Seeding was based on regular season play with the top six teams qualifying for the tournament.  The top two seeds received a bye to the Semifinals of the tournament and the higher seed hosted each match.  A tiebreaker was required to determine the sixth and final seed in the tournament as Army and Colgate finished with identical 3–4–2 records during the regular season.  Army was awarded the sixth seed by virtue of their 2–1 win over Colgate on October 9.

Bracket

Schedule

Quarterfinals

Semifinals

Final

Statistics

Goalscorers

All-Tournament team

Source:

MVP in bold

References 

 
Patriot League Women's Soccer Tournament